Pentti E. Hakkarainen (1944 – June 1, 2021) was a Lithuanian educational psychologist of Finnish origin.

Education and career
He graduated from the University of Jyväskylä in 1967, where he went on to obtain a master's degree and then a Ph.D. in 1970 and 1972, respectively. Hakkarainen defended his habilitated doctoral thesis in 1991. During the period of 1997-2011 he worked as professor at the University of Oulu and was elected as vice-dean of the Department of Educational Sciences in 2006. He was a professor of Lithuanian University of Educational Sciences since 2012 where he headed the Research Laboratory of Play (LUES, VMU). His research interests included creative, developmental teaching and learning in preschools, schools and higher education, narrative learning and development in play and virtual environments. He published a number of books in Finnish, English, and Lithuanian.

References

External links 
 
 

Finnish psychologists
Lithuanian psychologists
Vytautas Magnus University
Academic journal editors
20th-century psychologists
21st-century psychologists
Living people
University of Jyväskylä alumni
Academic staff of the Lithuanian University of Educational Sciences
1944 births